A Gaelscoil (plural: Gaelscoileanna) is an Irish language-medium school in Ireland: the term refers especially to Irish-medium schools outside the Irish-speaking regions or Gaeltacht. Over 50,000 students attend Gaelscoileanna at primary and second-level on the island of Ireland. Additionally, more than 13,000 students are receiving their primary and second level education through Irish in the Gaeltacht. Gaelscoileanna and Irish-medium schools in the Gaeltacht are supported and represented by Gaeloideachas and An Chomhairle um Oideachas Gaeltachta & Gaelscolaíochta or COGG in the Republic of Ireland and by Comhairle na Gaelscolaíochta in Northern Ireland.

Students in the Gaelscoileanna acquire the Irish language through language immersion, and study the standard curriculum through it. Gaelscoileanna, unlike English-medium schools, have the reputation of producing competent Irish speakers. English-medium schools, in contrast, produce relatively few fluent Irish speakers, despite the Irish language being an obligatory subject in the Republic of Ireland in both primary and secondary school. This has been attributed in part to the lack of Irish-language immersion programs.

Gaelscoileanna have undergone a striking expansion over the last few decades, although there are now concerns that rules limiting the founding of new schools is affecting the establishment of new Irish-medium education in areas where there is a competition amongst educational patrons. Their success is due to effective (though limited) community support and an efficient administrative infrastructure. They are distinguished by being the product, not of state policy, but of a genuine community movement.

In 1972 there were only 11 such schools at primary level and five at secondary level in the Republic of Ireland. In contrast, by September 2021 there were 185 gaelscoileanna at primary level, attended by over 40,000 students, and 31 gaelcholáistí and 17 aonaid Ghaeilge (Irish language units) at secondary level, attended by over 12,000 students in non-Gaeltacht areas across Ireland. 35 of these primary schools, two of the postprimary schools and four of the postprimary units operated are in Northern Ireland. Additionally, some 4,000 children attend Irish-medium preschools or Naíonraí outside the Gaeltacht with around 1,000 children attending Naíonraí within the Gaeltacht. There is now at least one gaelscoil in every county in Ireland with over 50 in County Dublin; 30 in County Cork and 13 in County Antrim included.

Social status and function
Gaelscoileanna have acquired a reputation for providing excellent academic results at a moderate cost. They have been described as a system of "positive social selection" giving better than average access to tertiary education and the social and employment opportunities which follow. An analysis of "feeder" schools which send students on to tertiary level institutions shows that 22% of Irish-medium schools send all their students on to tertiary level, compared to 7% of English-medium schools.

Supporters argue that the bilingualism resulting from early acquisition of another language is of general intellectual benefit and helps children to learn still other languages. Irish-language advocates of the immersion approach sometimes refer to studies showing that bilingual children have advantages over monoglot children in other subjects.

Statistics

By province (primary level)

 Leinster - 19,331 primary students attend 71 gaelscoileanna.
 Ulster - 6,801 primary students attend 45 gaelscoileanna.
 Munster - 11,332 primary students attend 44 gaelscoileanna.
 Connacht - 3,509 primary students attend 18 gaelscoileanna.

Post-primary education through Irish

At present over 12,000 students on the island of Ireland are receiving secondary education through Irish outside Gaeltacht areas. These include around 10,000 students in the Republic of Ireland. Two new second-level gaelscoileanna opened in Ireland in 2014: Coláiste Ghlór na Mara in Balbriggan and Gaelcholáiste an Phiarsaigh in Rathfarnham (both in County Dublin). Gaelcholáiste Charraig Uí Leighin opened in Carrigaline and Northern Ireland's second gaelcholáiste Gaelcholáiste Dhoire opened in Dungiven Castle in 2015. Gaelcholáiste Mhic Shuibhne opened in Knocknaheeney in 2019. Gaelcholáiste Mhaigh Nuad opened in Maynooth in September 2020. There are also campaigns running for several new gaelcholáistí in other areas.

20-Year Strategy 
The function and future of the Gaelscoileanna in the Republic of Ireland will be affected by the 20-Year Strategy for the Irish Language 2010-2030, published in December 2010. This emphasises the importance of offering all children in primary schools in Ireland the opportunity to experience partial immersion in the formative years of primary education. It calls for primary teachers to have additional immersion classes to improve their competence in the language. This would involve teaching some subjects such as Mathematics and Science in Irish. Such a policy, if implemented effectively, may mean that the gaelscoileanna will no longer be the largest means of promoting Irish/English language bilingualism in schoolchildren.

See also
 An Foras Pátrúnachta
 Education in the Republic of Ireland
 Education in Northern Ireland
 Official Languages Act 2003
 Calandreta, bilingual French-Occitan school in Occitania, France
 Diwan (school) – Breton medium education in Brittany
 Gaelic medium education in Scotland – Scottish Gaelic equivalent in Scotland
 Ikastola, similar education centre in Basque language
 La Bressola, a bilingual French-Catalan school network in Northern Catalonia, France
 List of Irish medium primary schools in Northern Ireland
 Medium of instruction
 Welsh medium education

References

External links
 List of Gaelscoileanna in Ireland (Northern Ireland and Republic of Ireland)
 Gaelscoileanna.ie (website of Gaelscoileanna Teo)
 Stats on Gaeltacht schools 2004
 Gaeltacht Comprehensive Language Study 2007
 Gaelscoil stats 2010–2011
 Republic of Ireland Census 2006 - daily speakers outside education system

 
Irish-language education
Medium of instruction
Celtic medium education
Irish words and phrases
Minority schools
School types
Language immersion